At least two ships of the French Navy have borne the name Henri Poincaré:

 , a  commissioned in 1931 and scuttled in 1942
 , a test and measurement vessel in service from 1968 to 1991

French Navy ship names